Karl Johan "Jonni" Hellström (13 May 1907 – 1989) was a Finnish boxer who competed in the 1928 Summer Olympics.

"The Fighting Finn" was born in Mariehamn and died in Canada.

In 1928 he was eliminated in the quarter-finals of the welterweight class after losing his fight to Robert Galataud.

1928 Olympic results
Below is the record of Johan Hellström, a Finnish welterweight boxer who competed at the 1928 Amsterdam Olympics:

 Round of 32: bye
 Round of 16: defeated Fred Ellis (South Africa) on points
 Quarterfinal: lost to Robert Galataud (France) on points

External links
profile

1907 births
1989 deaths
People from Mariehamn
People from Turku and Pori Province (Grand Duchy of Finland)
Swedish-speaking Finns
Welterweight boxers
Olympic boxers of Finland
Boxers at the 1928 Summer Olympics
Finnish male boxers
Finnish emigrants to Canada
Sportspeople from Åland